The 24th Gran Premio del Mediterraneo (Grand Prix of the Mediterranean), was the eighth round of the 1985 International Formula 3000. This was held on the Isle of Sicily, at the Autodromo di Pergusa, Enna, on 28 July.

Report

Entry
A total of just 15 F3000 cars, from 8 teams ventured across the Strait of Messina for the event.

Qualifying
Mike Thackwell took pole position for Team Ralt, in their Ralt-Cosworth RT20, averaging a speed of 123.768 mph.

Race

The race was held over 40 laps of the Enna-Pergusa circuit. Mike Thackwell took the winner spoils for works Ralt team, driving their Ralt-Cosworth RT20. The Kiwi won in a time of 1hr 01:58.99mins., averaging a speed of 119.103 mph. Just 0.63 seconds behind, was the second place car of Emanuele Pirro, driving Onyx Racing’s March 85B. The podium was completed by the BS Automotive March of Christian Danner.

Classification

Race Result

 Fastest lap: Christian Danner, 1:31.29secs. (121.446 mph)

References

Mediterranean
Mediterranean
Mediterranean Grand Prix